Paul Johannes Kruse (born March 15, 1970) is a Canadian former ice hockey left wing. He played in the National Hockey League with the Calgary Flames, New York Islanders, Buffalo Sabres, and San Jose Sharks between 1991 and 2001. He was drafted in the fourth round, 83rd overall, by the Calgary Flames in the 1990 NHL Entry Draft.

Playing career
After playing three seasons in the Western Hockey League with the Moose Jaw Warriors and Kamloops Blazers, Kruse joined the International Hockey League's Salt Lake Golden Eagles. After splitting three seasons between the Golden Eagles and the Flames, he joined the Flames full-time in the 1993–94 season.

During the 1996–97 season, Kruse was acquired by the New York Islanders. At the trade deadline of the 1997–98 season, he was traded, along with Jason Holland, to the Buffalo Sabres for Jason Dawe. Kruse was a member of the Buffalo Sabres team which went to the Stanley Cup Finals in the 1998–99 season, appearing in ten playoff games during the run.

Kruse's last NHL appearance came when he dressed for one game for the 2000–01 San Jose Sharks. He went to Europe after the season, playing two years in the United Kingdom's British Ice Hockey Superleague for the Sheffield Steelers and the Belfast Giants and one more year playing in Austria playing for EHC Black Wings Linz before retiring.

Kruse and his wife Laurie-Anne have two daughters. Mckinley and sierra kruse.

Career statistics

Regular season and playoffs

External links
 

1970 births
Living people
Belfast Giants players
Buffalo Sabres players
Calgary Flames draft picks
Calgary Flames players
Canadian expatriate ice hockey players in Austria
Canadian expatriate ice hockey players in England
Canadian expatriate ice hockey players in the United States
Canadian ice hockey left wingers
Chicago Wolves (IHL) players
EHC Black Wings Linz players
Ice hockey people from British Columbia
Ice Hockey Superleague players
Kamloops Blazers players
Merritt Centennials players
Moose Jaw Warriors players
New York Islanders players
People from the Thompson-Nicola Regional District
Salt Lake Golden Eagles (IHL) players
San Jose Sharks players
Sheffield Steelers players
Utah Grizzlies (IHL) players
Canadian expatriate ice hockey players in Northern Ireland